Raymond Watson Pepper (August 5, 1905 – March 24, 1996) was a Major League Baseball outfielder. He played all or part of five seasons in the majors, from  until , for the St. Louis Cardinals and St. Louis Browns. However, he only had 69 RBI in the rest of his career combined. Pepper holds the record for the least RBIs in a career for a player with a 100 RBI season.

References

External links

Major League Baseball outfielders
St. Louis Cardinals players
St. Louis Browns players
Marshalltown Ansons players
Topeka Jayhawks players
Laurel Cardinals players
Fort Wayne Chiefs players
Rochester Red Wings players
St. Joseph Saints players
Buffalo Bisons (minor league) players
Salisbury Senators players
Alabama Crimson Tide baseball players
Alabama Crimson Tide football players
Baseball players from Alabama
Sportspeople from Decatur, Alabama
1905 births
1996 deaths